Rashika Ahmed Fathi El Ridi is a professor of Immunology at the Department of Zoology Faculty of Science, Cairo University.

In October 2009, Professor Rashika El Ridi won L'Oréal-UNESCO Awards for Women in Science for the year 2010 within the five most achievable women in the continents of the world. The jury for the prize said in a statement that the winning of professor Rashika El Ridi for Africa Group and the Arab countries was based on her contribution to the development of a vaccine to eradicate the cycle of schistosomiasis, a tropical disease infecting more than 200 million people in the world.

References 

Living people
L'Oréal-UNESCO Awards for Women in Science laureates
21st-century women scientists
Year of birth missing (living people)
Egyptian women scientists
Egyptian immunologists
Women immunologists
Academic staff of Cairo University